In commutative algebra, the Auslander–Buchsbaum theorem states that regular local rings are unique factorization domains.

They showed that regular local rings of dimension 3 are unique factorization domains, and  had previously shown that this implies that all regular local rings are unique factorization domains.

References

Commutative algebra
Theorems in ring theory